Kai Chung Secondary School (abbreviation SMKC) is a public secondary school in Bintangor, a town in the East Malaysian state of Sarawak. This school is also a non-fully government school.

References

External links 
 Homepage of SM Kai Chung
 SM Kai Chung's Blog Site

Secondary schools in Sarawak
Educational institutions established in 1922
1922 establishments in Sarawak